The 2017–18 Saint Francis Red Flash women's basketball team represents Saint Francis University during the 2017–18 NCAA Division I women's basketball season.  The Red Flash's home games are played at the DeGol Arena. The team was a member of the Northeast Conference and was led by Joe Haigh, who was in his sixth year at the helm. They finished the season 24–10, 16–2 in NEC play to win the Northeast Regular Season Championship with Robert Morris. They were also champions of the NEC tournament and earns an automatic trip to the NCAA women's basketball tournament where they got demolished by the unbeaten UConn in the first round.

Roster

Schedule and results

|-
!colspan=12 style=| Exhibition

|-
!colspan=12 style=| Non-conference regular season

|-
!colspan=12 style=| NEC Regular Season

|-
!colspan=12 style=| NEC Women's Tournament

|-
!colspan=12 style=| NCAA Women's Tournament

See also
2017–18 Saint Francis Red Flash men's basketball team

References

Saint Francis Red Flash
Saint Francis Red Flash women's basketball seasons
Saint Francis